Ovington is a small village in north Essex, England.  The village is situated about three miles (5 km) from the village of Clare. It consists of St. Mary's Church, and a few houses. There is the air traffic of Ridgewell Airfield. (Usually gliders and sometimes military training exercises.) The population of the village is included in the civil parish of Tilbury Juxta Clare.

The earliest mention of this place is in the Domesday Book of 1086, where it is mentioned together with Hedingham Castle and listed amongst the lands given to Roger Bigod by the King.  The land given to Roger included  of meadow that was (in total) valued at four pounds.

References

External links

Villages in Essex
Braintree District